Gammel Strand 36 is a Neoclassical property overlooking Slotsholmen Canal in the Olt Town of Copenhagen, Denmark. The building was listed in the Danish registry of protected buildings and places in 1945. Notable former residents include the composer Franz Joseph Glæser.

History

18th century

The property was in the late 17th century part of a larger property. It was in Copenhagen's first cadastre of 1689 listed as No. 9 in Strand Quarter. It was at that time owned by one Jacob Kitserou's widow. The property was again listed as No. 9 in the new cadastre of 1756 and was then owned by Johan Gotfreid Wagner.

At the time of the 1787 census, No. 9 was home to two households. Christian Wilhelm Mengs (1734-1799), administrator of the Royal Danish Cotton Manufactory (Kongl.Danske Bomulds Manufactur), resided in the building with his wife Anne Mengs, their two daughters (aged 14 and 21), two office clerks, a floor clerk and a maid. Maria Cathrina Klauman, a 36-year-old widow, resided in the building with a housekeeper (husjomfru) and a maid.

The building was destroyed in the Copenhagen Fire of 1795, together with most of the other properties in the area.

19th century
The current building on the site was constructed in 1800–01 by master builder and architect Johan Christopher Suhr (1736–1801). No residents were recorded at the time of the 1801 census, indicating that it had not yet been completed by the time that the census took place.

The property was listed as No. 8 in the new cadastre of 1806. It was at that time owned by a man named Agerbeck.

At the time of the 1840 census, No. 8 was home to 28 residents in five households. Knud Nielsen Seith, a wholesale merchant (høker en gros), resided on the ground floor and in the basement with his wife Johanne Marie Seith, their 19-year-old son Niels Knudsen Seith, the daughter's one-year-old son Carl Knud Lund, a maid and a wet nurse. Elise Dorthea Olsen (née Balle, 1775–1853), widow of former theatre director	Gottsche Hans Olsen (1760-1829), resided on the first floor with her 29-year-old daughter  Vilhelmine Charlotte Elin Olsen, the 10-year-old girl Anne Margrethe Naja Hansen, one maid and three lodgers. Louise Auguste Charlotte Benzen, widow of a kanvelliråd, resided on the second floor with a maid and two lodgers. Hans Jacob Søbøtker, a retired naval officer with rank of captain lieutenant, resided on the third floor with two maids. Jens Larsen, a beer seller, resided in the basement with his wife Ellen Chatrine Kiøbenhavn, their two children (aged 13 and 15) and one maid.

At the time of the 1845 census, No. 8 was home to 24 residents. Johanne Maria Seith (mée Olsen), now 60 years old and awidow, resided on the ground floor with the son Niels Leith, her six-year-old grandson Carl Knud Lund and one maid. Anders Hansen Seith, another son and the operator of a grocery shop (høker) in the basement, resided in the associated dwelling with his wife Karen Seith, their one-year-old daughter and one maid. Franz Glaeser (1798–1861), leader of the Royal Danish Orchestra, resided on the first floor with his three children (aged nine to 14), a housekeeper (husjomfru) and a maid. Franz Christian Hagler, a captain in the Royal Danish Artillery Brigade, resided on the second floor with his wife Ernestine Fredderikke (née Ma??) and one maid. Julie Wilhelmine Thielsen, a widow, resided on the third floor with two of her children (aged 23 and 31), three lodgers and one maid.

Johanne Marie Seith	was five years later still residing on the ground flor of the building with her son and grandson. Anders and Karen Seith, now with three children (aged one to five), was also still residing in the basement. Glæser was still residing on the first floor. Christian Ditlev Michaelsen (1784-1863), a retired general war commissioner, resided in one of the apartments with his wife Anne Fredericke (née Fanøe) and one maid. Frederik Christian Feveile (1812-1888), a military chief physician, resided on the second floor with his wife Louise Elisabeth Augusta Feveile, their two daughters (aged one and three) and two maids.

Glæser moved to an apartment on Hauser Plads in 1852. J. Gram (1816–1871), professor of law at the University of Copenhagen, was a resident in the building in 1853–54.

At the time of the 1860 census, No. 8 was home to 24 residents. Niels Licth	and Lodovicka Juliette Christiane mée Holst resided with their two children (aged two and three) and two maids on the ground floor. 	 Karen Lecth, now a widow, was residing in the basement with her five children (aged six to 15), a housekeeper (husjomfru) and one maid. Carl Ferdinand Krog	(1776-1860=. a military officer with rank of mahjor general, resided on the first floor with his wife Catrine Sophia (née Schiøth), two of their daughters (aged 34 and 51) and one maid.	 Magdalene Cathrine Engelbrecht, a 70-year-old widow, resided on the second floor with one maid. Christian Detlev Michaelsen was still residing on the third floor with his wife and one maid.

Architecture
Gammel Strand 36 is constructed with flour storeys over a walk-out basement and is four bays wide. The door in the bay furthest to the right is topped by a triangular pediment. A basement entrance is located in the second bay from the left. The facade is finished by a dentilated cornice. A plaster frieze between the windows on the first and second floor and a band of masonry band  between the second and third floors were removed when the facade was first oil painted in 1849.

A three-bay side wing projects from the rear side the building and connects to a one-bay rear wing. The building was listed in the Danish registry of protected buildings and places in 1945.

References

External links

Listed residential buildings in Copenhagen
Residential buildings completed in 1801
1801 establishments in Denmark